RSCC may refer to:

 Rare Species Conservation Centre, Sandwich, Kent
 Roane State Community College, Tennessee
 Royal Selangor Country Club, Kuala Lumpur
 Russian Satellite Communications Company